Gorlepeta is a village in Srikakulam district of the Indian state of Andhra Pradesh. It is located in Ranastalam mandal, near the coast of Bay of Bengal. It comes under Krishnapuram Gram Panchayat.

References 

Villages in Srikakulam district